Albania is on the current agenda for future enlargement of the European Union (EU). It applied for EU membership on 28 April 2009, and has since June 2014 been an official candidate for accession. The Council of the European Union decided in March 2020 to open accession negotiations with Albania.

However, the country did not start accession negotiations because its candidacy was linked to that of North Macedonia, which was vetoed by Bulgaria. On 24 June 2022, Bulgaria's parliament approved lifting the country's veto on opening EU accession talks with North Macedonia. On 16 July 2022, the Assembly of North Macedonia also approved the revised French proposal, allowing accession negotiations to begin. The start of negotiations was officially launched on 19 July 2022.

Chronology of relations with the European Union
Officially recognised by the EU as a "potential candidate country" in 2000, Albania started negotiations on a Stabilisation and Association Agreement (SAA) in 2003. This was successfully agreed and signed on 12 June 2006, thus completing the first major step toward Albania's full membership in the EU.

Albania applied for European Union membership on 28 April 2009. After Albania's application for EU membership, the Council of the European Union asked the European Commission on 16 November 2009 to prepare an assessment on the readiness of Albania to start accession negotiations. On 16 December 2009, the European Commission submitted the Questionnaire on accession preparation to the Albanian government. Albania returned answers to the Commission on 14 April 2010. On 5 December 2013, an MEP meeting recommended to the council to grant Albania candidate status. On 23 June 2014, under the Greek EU Presidency, the Council of the European Union agreed to grant Albania candidate status, which was endorsed by the European Council a few days later. Following in the steps of countries joining the EU in 2004, Albania has been extensively engaged with EU institutions, and joined NATO as a full member in 2009.

The European Commission recommended that the EU open membership talks with Albania in its November 2016 assessment. In June 2018 the European Council agreed on a pathway to starting accession talks with Albania by the end of 2019.

Albania's EU accession is bundled with North Macedonia's EU accession. Albania is given certain pre-conditions for starting the accession negotiations, such as passing reforms in the justice system, a new electoral law, opening trials for corrupt judges and the respect of human rights for its Greek minority.

In May 2019, European Commissioner Johannes Hahn reiterated this recommendation. However, in June the EU General Affairs Council decided to postpone their decision on opening negotiations to October, due to objections from a number of countries including the Netherlands and France. The decision was vetoed again in October. On 25 March 2020, the Council of the European Union decided to open accession negotiations, which was endorsed by the European Council the following day.

Visa liberalisation process 
On 1 January 2008 the visa facilitation and readmission agreements between Albania and the EU entered into force.
Albania received a road map from the EU for further visa liberalisation with Schengen countries in June 2008.

Albania started issuing biometric passports on 24 May 2009, which were designed to comply with EU guidelines. On 8 November 2010 the Council of the European Union approved visa-free travel to the EU for citizens of Albania. The decision entered into force on 15 December 2010.

EU financial aid
In 2011, the EU paid €6 million to construct or refurbish border crossing points and border police stations to help Albania fight organised crime and illegal trafficking.

Until 2020, Albania had been receiving €1.2bn of developmental aid from the Instrument for Pre-Accession Assistance, a funding mechanism for EU candidate countries.

Negotiation progress
The screening process is underway and no chapters have been opened thus far.

Public opinion
	
A 2021 poll found that as many as 97% of Albanians are in favour of EU accession.

See also
Accession of North Macedonia to the European Union 
Accession of Serbia to the European Union
Albania–NATO relations
Delegation of European Union to Albania
Enlargement of the European Union
Future enlargement of the European Union

References

Further reading
 Albania and the European Union: the tumultuous journey towards integration ... By Mirela Bogdani, John Loughlin, 2007
 Delegation of the European Union to Albania
 European Commission - Enlargement: Country Profile.
 Albanian Ministry of European Integration
 Albanian Ministry of Foreign Affairs
 European Commission - Western Balkans: Enhancing the European perspective
 European Commission - Enlargement Strategy and Main Challenges 2009-2010

Albania
Albania–European Union relations